Romagnoli is an Italian surname meaning "Romagnan", "of Romagna", "from Romagna". Notable people with the surname include:

Luca Romagnoli, Italian politician and MEP;
Leandro Romagnoli, Argentine football midfielder.
Alessio Romagnoli, Italian footballer playing for  club Lazio
Simone Romagnoli, Italian footballer born in 1990
Martín Romagnoli, Argentine football midfielder who plays for UNAM
Riccardo Romagnoli, Italian auto racing driver
Diana Romagnoli, Swiss fencer
Gian Franco Romagnoli, Italian chef, author, and television personality

Italian-language surnames
Italian toponymic surnames
Ethnonymic surnames